Min Gyeong-seung (born 10 February 1962) is a South Korean fencer. He competed in the team épée event at the 1984 Summer Olympics.

References

External links
 

1962 births
Living people
South Korean male épée fencers
Olympic fencers of South Korea
Fencers at the 1984 Summer Olympics